

Naval Bases 

Naval Base Korsør, Korsør
Naval Base Frederikshavn, Frederikshavn

Naval Stations 
Naval Station Esbjerg, Esbjerg
Naval Station Holmen, Copenhagen
Naval Station Kongsøre, Kongsøre
Naval Station Lyngsbæk, Lyngsbæk
Naval Station Møn, Møn
Naval Station Århus, Århus

Air Force Bases 

Aalborg Air Base, Aalborg
Karup Air Base, Karup
Skrydstrup Air Base, Skrydstrup
Værløse Air Base, Værløse - Closed
Vandel Air Base - Closed

Army Bases 
 Aalborg Kaserne, Aalborg
 Antvorskov Kaserne, Slagelse
 Bornholm
 Fredericia Kaserne, Fredericia
 Haderslev Kaserne, Haderslev
 Holbæk Barracks, Holbæk - Closed
 Holstebro Kaserne, Holstebro
 Høvelte Kaserne, Høvelte
 Hyby Fælled Proving ground
 Langelandsgade Kaserne, Aarhus - Closed
 Nymindegab Barracks
 Oksbøl Kaserne
 Rosenborg Kaserne, Copenhagen
 Roskilde Kaserne, Roskilde - Closed
 Skive Kaserne, Skive
 Sølvgade Kaserne, Copenhagen - Closed
 Varde Kaserne, Varde
 Vordingborg Kaserne, Vordingborg